Sammy James Davis, Jr. (born April 8, 1980) is a former American football cornerback. He is a businessman and owner of the Austin Capitals, an American Basketball Association franchise. He was drafted by the San Diego Chargers 30th overall in the 2003 NFL Draft. He played college football at Texas A&M. Davis also played for the San Francisco 49ers and Tampa Bay Buccaneers.

Career
After a collegiate career at Texas A&M, Davis played for the San Diego Chargers for three seasons. He then spent single seasons with the San Francisco 49ers and Tampa Bay Buccaneers. Davis started 16 games in his rookie season, but he never started more than ten games in a season between 2004 and 2007.

During his NFL career, Davis was involved in the development of a system that allowed football players to drink water while on the playing field, utilizing water pouches stored under the shoulder pads.

References

External links
Tampa Bay Buccaneers bio

1980 births
Living people
Players of American football from Houston
People from Humble, Texas
American football cornerbacks
Texas A&M Aggies football players
San Diego Chargers players
San Francisco 49ers players
Tampa Bay Buccaneers players